Wrestling Dontaku 2019 was a professional wrestling event promoted by New Japan Pro-Wrestling (NJPW). The event took place on May 3 and 4, 2019, in Fukuoka, at the Fukuoka Kokusai Center. The first night of the event featured eight matches, with two championships at stake, while the second night featured a championship match out of eight matches overall. The main event of the first night was Dragon Lee defending the IWGP Junior Heavyweight Champion against Taiji Ishimori, and the second night's main event was Kazuchika Okada defending the IWGP Heavyweight Championship against Sanada. This was the sixteenth event under the Wrestling Dontaku name.

Storylines
Each night of Wrestling Dontaku 2019 featured eight professional wrestling matches that involved different wrestlers from pre-existing scripted feuds and storylines. Wrestlers portrayed villains, heroes, or less distinguishable characters in the scripted events that built tension and culminated in a wrestling match or series of matches.

Results

Night 1

Night 2

References

External links
The official New Japan Pro-Wrestling website

2019
2019 in professional wrestling
May 2019 events in Japan